Pablo Enrique Shorey Hernandez (born December 4, 1983) is a male wrestler from Cuba.

External links
 bio on fila-wrestling.com

Living people
1983 births
Cuban male sport wrestlers
Wrestlers at the 2012 Summer Olympics
Wrestlers at the 2011 Pan American Games
Olympic wrestlers of Cuba
World Wrestling Championships medalists
Pan American Games gold medalists for Cuba
Pan American Games medalists in wrestling
Medalists at the 2011 Pan American Games
20th-century Cuban people
21st-century Cuban people